The following radio stations broadcast on AM frequency 558 kHz:

Australia
VL4AM at Atherton, Queensland
VL4GY at Gympie, Queensland
VL6WA at Wagin, Western Australia

Iran
 Radio Iran in Tehran

Japan
 Radio Kansai in Kobe, Hyogo

Philippines

United Kingdom
Panjab Radio at London

References

Lists of radio stations by frequency